Makarios C. is a district of the Municipality of Kato Polemidia.

Location 
To the south it borders with Apostolos Andreas, to the east with Agios Georgios, to the north with Panagia Evangelistria and to the west with Apostolos Barnabas.

History 
The district developed after the construction of the refugee settlement in which Greek Cypriot refugees settled after the Turkish invasion of 1974.

Religious sites 
The sacred church of the district is dedicated to Agios Neophytos. Construction began in 2005 and was completed in 2007.

References

Quarters of Kato Polemidia